Agyneta insolita is a species of sheet weaver found in Nigeria. It was described by Locket & Russell-Smith in 1980.

References

insolita
Spiders of Africa
Endemic fauna of Nigeria
Invertebrates of West Africa
Spiders described in 1980